Protodeltote wiscotti is a species of moth of the family Noctuidae first described by Otto Staudinger in 1888. It is found in the Russian Far East and Japan.

The length of the forewings is 10–12.5 mm. The forewings are fuscous tinged with ochreous on the costa, suffused with white below the costa and postmedial area, and sprinkled with rufous on the median portion. The hindwings are white and sprinkled with pale brown.

References

Moths described in 1888
Acontiinae
Moths of Japan